Carl von Münstermann  (December 20, 1843 in Werne - 20 September 1930 in Berlin-Wilmersdorf) was a German engineer and land improvement officer. He was a professor of culture and technology at the Agricultural University of Berlin (Landwirtschaftliche Hochschule Berlin).

References

Engineers from North Rhine-Westphalia
German agronomists
1843 births
1930 deaths
People from Werne